Finn Stam (born 13 April 2003) is a Dutch footballer who plays for Jong AZ as a central defender.

Career
Stam used to play as a striker but converted into a central defender for AZ under-15’s. Stam’s progress earned him a first professional contract with AZ on 19 June 2021. In July, 2021 he played in a friendly tournament called The Future of Football Cup in which FIFA experimented with rule changes including kick-ins, rolling subs, 30 minute stop clock halves, and sin-bins. Stam made his Eerste Divisie debut on the 18 March 2022, away at Jong FC Utrecht.

References 

2003 births
Living people
Dutch footballers
Association football defenders
Eerste Divisie players
Jong AZ players